Mir Saadullah Shahabadi (fl. 1780s) was a Kashmiri poet who wrote a Persian language verse history of Kashmir called Bagh-i-Sulaiman (Garden of Solomon, 1780). It is mainly derived from the earlier History of Kashmir of Muhammed Azam Didamari, but updates the history to the reign of Juma Khan (1787–1793 CE).

References

People from Srinagar
History of Kashmir
18th-century Indian poets
Poets from Jammu and Kashmir
Indian male poets
18th-century male writers